Socialism is a political philosophy and economic system
based on the collective ownership and control of the means of production; as well as the political and economic theories, ideologies and movements that aim to establish a socialist system.

Socialism may also refer to:

 Scientific socialism, a method of analysis pioneered by Karl Marx and Friedrich Engels and used to analyze capitalism, where socialism is postulated to emerge from capitalist development; in the late 19th century it widely became known as Marxism
 Socialist mode of production, a more specific concept of socialist organization articulated by Marxist theory of historical materialism
 Socialist Party, or capital-s "Socialists", the policies and practices of titular Socialist political parties irrespective of whether or not they adhere to the implementation of a socialist system
 Socialist Party (disambiguation), variations on the above
 Socialist state, a country governed by a socialist party with the constitutional aim of constructing socialism
 Real socialism, a phrase sometimes used to refer to the Soviet-type planned economies in the former Soviet Union and Eastern Bloc

Media
 Socialism, a book by John Stuart Mill
 Socialism: An Economic and Sociological Analysis, a book by Ludwig von Mises
 Socialism: Utopian and Scientific, an essay by Friedrich Engels
 Film Socialisme, a 2010 film directed by Jean-Luc Godard
 SOCiALiSM, a 2017 single released by the Japanese idol group BiS